Ivan Saraiva de Souza or simply Ivan (born January 18, 1982, in Campinas), is a Brazilian left back. He currently plays for Mersin İdmanyurdu SK.

Honours
Brazilian League: 2001
Parana State Superleague: 2002
Brazilian Cup: 2007

Contract
Gaziantepspor (Loan) 26 January 2008 to 30 June 2009
Atlético-PR 1 November 2005 to 31 January 2009

References

External links
 sambafoot

 placar
 furacao
 Guardian Stats Centre 
 zerozero.pt

1982 births
Living people
Brazilian footballers
Club Athletico Paranaense players
FC Shakhtar Donetsk players
Fluminense FC players
Gaziantepspor footballers
Ukrainian Premier League players
Süper Lig players
Brazilian expatriate footballers
Brazilian expatriate sportspeople in Turkey
Expatriate footballers in Turkey
Expatriate footballers in Ukraine
Brazilian expatriate sportspeople in Ukraine
Association football defenders
Sportspeople from Campinas